Daniel Fuss is the vice chairman of Loomis, Sayles & Company and manager of the $18.5 billion Loomis Sayles Bond Fund. SmartMoney magazine in July 2008 called him one of the world's best investors.

He earned his bachelor's and MBA degrees at Marquette University. He is a former U.S. Navy lieutenant. He formerly managed the Yale University endowment.

He manages the Bond Fund with Matt Eagan.

References

External links
 "Financial Service Focus,"  Marquette University
 "INVESTING WITH: Daniel J. Fuss and Kathleen C. Gaffney; Loomis Sayles Bond Fund," The New York Times, December 15, 2002
 Daniel Fuss Biography at Loomis, Sayles & Company, L.P.
 "Loomis Sayles Matt Eagan on the Macro and Fixed Income Outlook"  team
https://www.marketwatch.com/story/loomis-sayles-matt-eagan-interview-a-must-read-2012-12-07

Living people
Year of birth missing (living people)